Top Moon (1960-1984)  was a Quarter Horse racehorse and leading racehorse sire.

Life

Top Moon was a 1960 black stallion sired by Moon Deck out of Rica Bar. Rica Bar was a granddaughter of Three Bars (TB).

Racing career 
Top Moon raced for three years, starting forty times. In those starts he won fifteen times, came in second nine times and placed third five times. He attained a top speed rating of AAAT alongside earnings of $40,636.00. He won two stakes races, the PCQHRA Futurity and the Bardella Stakes.

Breeding record 
As a breeding stallion, Top Moon  sired Top Bug, Bug's Alive in 75, Moon Lark, Lady Bug's Moon, Casady Casanova, and Full Moon Zestee. Bugs Alive in 75 won the 1975 All American Futurity as well as being named 1975 Champion Quarter Running Stallion. Moon Lark won the All American Futurity in 1978 and was named 1978 Champion Quarter Running Two Year Old Colt, and 1979 World Champion Quarter Running Horse.

Death and honors 
Top Moon died in 1984 when he developed complications from an ear infection.

Top Moon was inducted into the American Quarter Horse Association's (or AQHA) AQHA Hall of Fame in 1999.

Pedigree

Notes

References

 All Breed Pedigree Database Pedigree for Top Moon accessed on June 27, 2007
 AQHA Hall of Fame accessed on September 2, 2017

External links
 Top Moon at Quarter Horse Directory
 Top Moon at Quarter Horse Legends

American Quarter Horse racehorses
Racehorses bred in the United States
Racehorses trained in the United States
American Quarter Horse sires
1960 racehorse births
AQHA Hall of Fame (horses)